Aplysiopsis is a genus of sacoglossan sea slugs, a shell-less marine opisthobranch gastropod mollusks in the family Hermaeidae.

Species 
Species within the genus Aplysiopsis include 9 valid species:
 Aplysiopsis brattstroemi (Marcus, 1959)
 Aplysiopsis elegans (Deshayes, 1835)
 Aplysiopsis enteromorphae (Cockerell & Eliot, 1905)
 Aplysiopsis formosa (Pruvot-Fol, 1953)
 Aplysiopsis minor (Baba, 1959)
 Aplysiopsis nigra (Baba, 1949)
 Aplysiopsis orientalis (Baba, 1949)
 Aplysiopsis sinusmensalis (Macnae, 1954)
 Aplysiopsis toyamana (Baba, 1959)

Invalid species named Aplysiopsis include:
 Aplysiopsis maculosa (Trinchese, 1874)
 Aplysiopsis smithi (Marcus, 1961)
 Aplysiopsis zebra (Clark, 1982)

References

Hermaeidae